The name SS Nile has been given to a number of ships over the years. These include:

 , sank off Godrevy Head, Cornwall in 1854
 SS Nile (1919), later , torpedoed in 1941

Ship names